Glyphidocera chungchinmookara is a moth in the family Autostichidae. It was described by Adamski and Brown in 2001. It is found in Venezuela.

The length of the forewings is 8.6–10 mm. The forewing colour consists of pale brown intermixed with a few dark-brown scales and dark-brown scales tipped with pale brown. The major veins are demarcated with dark-brown scales. The discal spots are absent and the marginal scales are brown. The hindwings are pale brown with elongate scales on the basal two-thirds.

Etymology
The species is named in honor of Chung Chin Mook.

References

Moths described in 2001
Taxa named by David Adamski
Glyphidocerinae